The League of Gentlemen may refer to:

 The League of Gentlemen, a black comedy television series that premiered on BBC Two in 1999
 The League of Gentlemen (novel), (1958)
 The League of Gentlemen (film), (1960)
 The League of Gentlemen (band)
 The League of Gentlemen (album), (1980)
 The League of Gentlemen, a film in the Pandora's Box TV documentary series (1992)

See also
 The League of Extraordinary Gentlemen, (1999) a comic book series
 The League of Extraordinary Gentlemen (film), (2003)
 The League of Gentlemen's Apocalypse, (2005) film based on the television series